Gerasim Zakov (born 7 September 1984) is a Bulgarian footballer who most recently played for CSKA 1918 as a striker. Zakov served as the team's captain. He has also played for the Bulgarian U21 squad between 2003 and 2005.

Career
Zakov joined CSKA Sofia as an academy player at the age of 13, with his first coach being Angel Rangelov, and signed his professional contract with the first team in 2002. Zakov made his league debut on 30 May 2002, in the 0:1 away loss against Litex Lovech. He stayed 4 seasons at CSKA and become 2 times champion of the Bulgaria premier league and 2 times finished in 2nd place in the Bulgarian national cup. During the 2011–2012 season he scored 11 goals in the premier league for his team Kaliakra(Kavarna) and took 4th place in the top goalscorers' ranking in the league, 4 goals less than the winner Júnior Moraes from CSKA(Sofia). After this season he moved to Litex (Lovech) who was at the time coached by Bulgarian top football star Hristo Stoichkov. Zakov scored 5 goals in 15 games in the league and 3 goals in the Bulgarian national cup. At the half point of the season he moved to China and signed a contract with Chengdu Blades. From 2015 Zakov is a former player of Sisaket FC, a team from the Thai premier league.

Honours

Club
CSKA Sofia
 A PFG (2): 2002–03, 2004–05

References

External links

1984 births
Living people
Bulgarian footballers
First Professional Football League (Bulgaria) players
PFC CSKA Sofia players
PFC Vidima-Rakovski Sevlievo players
PFC Beroe Stara Zagora players
PFC Lokomotiv Plovdiv players
PFC Cherno More Varna players
PFC Kaliakra Kavarna players
PFC Litex Lovech players
Chengdu Tiancheng F.C. players
Neftochimic Burgas players
Gerasim Zakov
Association football forwards
Expatriate footballers in China
Expatriate footballers in Thailand
Gerasim Zakov
China League One players